The Gulf of Gemlik is an inlet of the Sea of Marmara in the Marmara region of Turkey. The gulf is located in the southwestern part of the sea. Mudanya, Gemlik and Armutlu are the major towns surrounding the gulf.

External links
 Detailed map of the Gulf of Gemlik

Landforms of Bursa Province
Gulfs of Turkey
Sea of Marmara